UEFA Euro 2004 was a football tournament that took place in Portugal between 12 June and 4 July 2004. The 16 teams that qualified for the competition were required to submit a final 23-man squad by 2 June 2004, although injured squad members could be replaced at any time up to 24 hours before their team's first match.

The players' ages, clubs and caps are accurate as of 12 June 2004, the tournament's opening day.

Group A

Greece
Manager:  Otto Rehhagel

Greece named their final squad on 23 May 2004.

Portugal
Manager:  Luiz Felipe Scolari

Portugal named their final squad on 18 May 2004.

Russia
Manager: Georgi Yartsev

Russia named their final squad on 2 June 2004. Aleksandr Mostovoi was sent home from the tournament on 15 June due to alleged attacks on the cohesion of the group. Caps include those for USSR, CIS, and Russia.

Spain
Manager: Iñaki Sáez

Spain named their initial 23-man squad on 20 May 2004. Real Madrid right-back Michel Salgado was originally named in the squad but suffered a torn thigh muscle and was replaced by Deportivo La Coruña full-back Joan Capdevila.

Group B

Croatia
Manager: Otto Barić

Croatia named their final squad on 2 June 2004. Goalkeeper Stipe Pletikosa sustained a thigh injury a few days before the beginning of the tournament, and so was withdrawn from the squad, with Vladimir Vasilj taking his place.

England
Manager:  Sven-Göran Eriksson

England named their final squad on 17 May 2004.

France
Manager: Jacques Santini

France named their final squad on 18 May 2004. Midfielder Ludovic Giuly tore a groin muscle during the 2004 UEFA Champions League Final on 26 May and was replaced by striker Sidney Govou three days later.

Switzerland
Manager: Köbi Kuhn

Switzerland named an initial 26-man squad on 24 May 2004. Stéphane Grichting and Rémo Meyer were both cut from the final squad, while Marco Streller broke his left tibia and fibula and Léonard Thurre tore a calf muscle in training; they were replaced in the final 23-man squad by 18-year-old PSV Eindhoven forward Johan Vonlanthen.

On 6 June, midfielder Johann Lonfat was withdrawn from the squad after suffering a back injury; he was originally going to be replaced by Juventus forward Davide Chiumiento, but he declined the selection in favour of waiting for a call-up by Italy, meaning that Tranquillo Barnetta replaced Lonfat instead. Goalkeeper Fabrice Borer suffered a broken arm in training on 12 June and was replaced by Sébastien Roth before Switzerland's opening game against Croatia the next day.

Group C

Bulgaria
Manager: Plamen Markov

Bulgaria named their squad on 19 May 2004.

Denmark
Manager: Morten Olsen

Denmark named their squad on 1 June 2004.

Italy
Manager: Giovanni Trapattoni

Italy named their squad on 18 May 2004.

Sweden
Managers: Lars Lagerbäck & Tommy Söderberg

Sweden named their squad on 6 May 2004. Southampton full-back Michael Svensson was ruled out of the tournament on 26 May after failing to recover from a knee injury; he was replaced by Hammarby defender Alexander Östlund.

Group D

Czech Republic
Manager: Karel Brückner

The Czech Republic named an initial 24-man squad on 19 May 2004.

Germany
Manager: Rudi Völler

Germany named an initial 22-man squad on 24 May 2004, with coach Rudi Völler leaving one space open for an under-21 player. Hamburger SV defender Christian Rahn withdrew from the squad on 26 May and was replaced by left-back Christian Ziege, who had recently been released by Tottenham Hotspur. VfL Bochum winger Paul Freier was also ruled out on 29 May after damaging knee ligaments in a warm-up friendly against Malta on 27 May; his withdrawal allowed both early contenders for the 23rd place in the squad, Bastian Schweinsteiger and Lukas Podolski, to be selected.

Latvia
Manager: Aleksandrs Starkovs

Latvia named their squad on 29 May 2004.

Netherlands
Manager: Dick Advocaat

The Netherlands named their squad on 19 May 2004.

Player representation

References

External links
EURO 2004 official site
weltfussball.de 

2004
Squads